Incident at Midnight is a 1963 British crime film directed by Norman Harrison and starring Anton Diffring, William Sylvester and Justine Lord. It was made at Merton Park Studios as part of the series of Edgar Wallace Mysteries, in this case adapted from one of Wallace's short stories.

Plot
Old Dr. Schroeder (Martin Miller), who has been struck off, attends a late night chemist every night for a prescription, and to observe Dr. Leichner (Anton Diffring), an ex-Nazi war criminal who has taken a new identity. Leichner, we discover, has a blonde wife (Sylva Langova), and a blonde mistress (Jacqueline Jones), who is blackmailing him. He is also involved in a drug scam involving two lockers and two keys, and aims to become a millionaire selling drugs. Meanwhile, a wounded bank robber has been taken to the dispensary for treatment, and to rendezvous with his gang leader. Old Dr. Schroeder finds himself attending to the robber's injuries.

Cast

Critical reception
Sky Movies wrote that the "harsh black-and-white photography effectively catches the bleak, claustrophobic atmosphere of the all-night chemist's in which some of the drama is set"; while Leonard Maltin rated it two stars, calling it a "trim yarn."

References

External links

1963 films
British crime films
British black-and-white films
1963 crime films
1960s English-language films
Edgar Wallace Mysteries
1960s British films